Robertia Boonstra, 1948, is an extinct genus of therapsids.

Robertia may also refer to:

Animals:
 Robertia Travassos & Kloss, 1961, a synonym of the nematode genus Traklosia
 Robertia Saaristo, 2006, a synonym of the spider genus Seycellesa

Plants:
 Robertia Mérat, an invalid synonym of Eranthis (Ranunculaceae)
 Robertia Scopoli, an invalid synonym Sideroxylon (Sapotaceae)

See also
Robertians, a ruling family of the Kingdom of the Franks
Robertsia, a genus of wasps